The 1st BET Awards took place at the Paris Hotel in Las Vegas, Nevada on June 19, 2001. The awards recognized Americans in music, acting, sports, and other fields of entertainment over the past year. Comedian Steve Harvey and Cedric the Entertainer hosted the event for the first time.

Performances

 Sisqo – "Can I Live"
 Usher – "U Remind Me"
 Snoop Dogg, Nate Dogg and Master P – "Lay Low"
 Patti LaBelle and Donnie McClurkin – "Stand!"
 Outkast – "Ms. Jackson" and "So Fresh, So Clean"
 Lil' Bow Wow and Snoop Dogg – "Bow Wow (That's My Name)"
 Jay Z – "Fiesta", "I Just Wanna Love U (Give It 2 Me)" and "H to the Izzo"
 Destiny's Child – "Bootylicious"
 Eve and Gwen Stefani – "Let Me Blow Ya Mind"
• Whitney Houston Lifetime Achievement Award Tribute:
 Christina Aguilera – "Run to You"
 Luther Vandross — "All the Woman That I Need"
 Whitney Houston — "I Have Nothing" and "I Will Always Love You"

Winners and nominees

BET Awards